This is the list of characters appearing in the anime Jewelpet Twinkle.

Main characters

Voiced by: Natsumi Takamori
Ruby and Labra's human partner and the series's main protagonist, she is the younger sister of Monica Sakura. 12-years old (13 after episode 17), Akari hails from Hayama, Kanagawa Prefecture in Japan who studies in Winston Academy. She is an aspiring manga artist who is shy but very bright and gentle. However she's always been out-shunned by her older sister's popularity and status of being an Teen Idol and Student Council President. She accidentally met Ruby on her first day of school but later formed as she realizes that the feelings of her heart matches Ruby and becoming partners. When she became a beginner magician in Jewel Land's Magic Academy, she met up with other people in where she decides to join the Jewel Star Grand Prix. and make her wish come true. Akari also has a crush on Yuma Jinnai, a member of the school's basketball team, finding out later that he's related to the Battest.

Akari's Magical Outfit is themed in Pink and magic skills were considered as weak. But as the series progresses, she starts to master powerful spells and meeting up new friends and rivals along the way. As of the OVA, she is now the current holder of the title "Jewel Star" and now Yuma's Girlfriend and ascended to Junior High in Winston Academy alongside Yuma and Alma.

Voiced by: Ayana Taketatsu
Garnet and Sango's human partner, Miria Marigold Mackenzie is an 8-year-old girl who lives in Hollywood, and the daughter of Celine Bright. She loves watching cartoons, anime and cosplaying. She considers herself a "KMB" (or ) and often brags about her magical skills, though she can sometimes be a bit irresponsible when using her magic. However she learns her mistakes and moves on. She misses both her mom and dad, who were singer and manager respectively. Her mom is often away because of her singing career, and Miria hasn't seen her dad for many years. She has a crush on Leon.

Miria's Magical Outfit is all themed in cats, occasionally had special colors in them. Her magic skills were average, though she lets out her full potential as a mage. As of the OVA, she finally became a famous singer and now hosts a concert in Japan just to see Akari and the others again.

Voiced by: Azusa Kataoka
Sapphie's human partner, Sara is a 13-year-old half-Japanese half-Indian girl with red eyes and blue hair. She's the genius prodigy who likes science, especially chemistry, physics, and inventions, and is constantly reading magic books. She lives away from her parents for her research, guarded by the government and doesn't talk much, sometimes coming off as a cold-hearted person. She is expert on using magic with chemistry and magical physics while making her experiments successful, but she has phobia towards mushrooms. Also she doesn't like immodest clothing. Both Nicola and Miria think she's weird, but Akari thinks Sara is a nice person inside, although she doesn't show it. She and Nicola are rivals due to their knowledge in magic, but this was set aside.

Sara's Magical Outfit is themed in blue and both her magic and knowledge were the most highest in Akari's class. By the OVA, Sara finally became open minded after meeting her parents once again.

Supporting Characters

Voiced by: Kenji Akabane, Aki Kanada (Younger Version)
Leon is Dian's human partner and the oldest candidate of the Jewel Star Grand Prix. A guy from Austria, he has high awareness skills with magic and is also an excellent swordsman, who can use both magic and his swordsmanship. He can also turn his pen into a sword by using magic and uses it in any battle he fights. Miria has a crush on him and he admires Akari's determination in her magic studies. His past is tragic due to the loss of his dog, Roger, during his childhood before he met Dian. Dian encourages him to cheer up and never became depressed and shameful in front of the grave of Leon's departed pet. Leon's wish when he obtains the Jewel Star title is to be the king of Jewel Land and improve the relationship between the Rarerare world and Jewel Land.

He and Dian can cast magic using the Jewel Charm and has a magical costume, like the girls, but this isn't shown until episode 37.

Voiced by: Momoko Ohara
Nicola is Titana's human partner and the youngest of all the Jewel Star Contestants. He's a young genius pianist from Russia and a smart aleck who likes to annoy Akari and Ruby. He calls himself a Super Genius, though he's a brat. He initially called Ruby and Akari the "dropout pair" due to their low magical ranking. Everyone normally considers him an annoying and arrogant kid, and he sometimes makes Labra cry. Nicola also stands as Sara's rival in the Jewel Star Grand Prix due to their knowledge in magic. His meeting with Titana happened after he won a piano championship as he has good piano playing skills. However, Nicola thinks his mother wasn't pleased with his achievements, making him sad as he was ordered to practice more so he can't fail a competition and be embarrassed. Titana appeared on Nicola's piano when he was crying while practicing at the same time. Titana liked his performance and Nicola's tears of sadness changed to tears of joy, since someone actually liked the piano piece that he played from his heart. His wish after he obtains the Jewel Star title is to be recognized as a famous pianist and wanting his mother to recognize his achievements even more as her son.

Nicola and Titana can also use magic together and has a magical costume, like the girls, but this isn't shown until episode 42.

Voiced by: Shinnosuke Tachibana
Alma's twin brother living in the Rarerare world, and one of Fealina's twin children, Yuma is also a student of the Winston Academy. He calm and nice, and sometimes helps Akari out in a pinch. He also likes basketball; he says so at one point while talking to Akari. His father died a long time and Fealina is in Eternal Sleep back in Jewel Land, with him living with his grandparents. Yuma is shown to have a strange birthmark on his right arm similar to that of Alma's, explaining that he and Alma once lived together and not knowing he's a key on unlocking the Battest. Akari has a crush on him, which he later accepts her as her girlfriend and also knows all about the Jewelpets, Jewel Land and Akari being a magician, and has promised to keep the origins of the Jewelpets in secret after she told him her secret.

In the Grand Prix Arc, he confessed to Akari that he loves her as she returned the love. Later on, with the help of Akari, Alma, and the other Jewelpets, he revived his mother, whom he and his sister now live with. In the OVA, he's now Akari's boyfriend and is now living with Alma and Fealina.

Voiced by: Rie Kugimiya
Kaiya's human partner and Akari's rival in the Magic Academy, Marianne is a member of the Magical Angels. Dubbed "Celebrity Angel" and candidate of the Jewel Star Grand Prix who has collected all 12 Jewel Stones in her study in the Magic Academy. She first appeared in the end of episode 15 along with her two sisters, and formally debuted in episode 16. She has a strong crush on Leon (she and her sisters met him in the Rarerare world) and despises the newbie students who were too weak on their studies. She thinks Leon is paying too much attention to Akari, Miria and Sara, causing her to get jealous on them, especially to Akari. Despite her personality, her magic skills is above average since she has 12 Jewel Stones.

Voiced by: Rei Matsuzaki
Catherine is the second member of the Magical Angels and Ryl's human partner. Known as the "Second Angel", she is the second-oldest sister of Marianne and an expert magician as well, having 10 Jewel Stones on her hand right below Marianne.

Voiced by: MAKO
Angelina is the third member of the Magical Angels and Amelie's human partner. She is referred to as the "Maid Angel" and is the youngest of all the sisters. Angelina is bit of a novice magician of the three, having 9 Jewel Stones.

Other Characters

Voiced by: Yuka Iguchi
Monica Sakura is Akari's older sister, a famous teen celebrity and student council president of the Winston Academy. Because of her popularity, Akari developed an inferiority complex towards her, making her depressed and jealous. She is unaware about Akari's attendance in the Magic Academy in Jewel Land and even of the existence of the Jewelpets, even though both Ruby and Labra are living with Akari.

Voiced by: Hisako Kanemoto
Judy is Prase's human partner. She's the former champion of the Jewel Star Grand Prix and obtained the title, as well as the crown. She's also former student of the Magic Academy Akari and her friends attend. Judy appeared before Akari when she was transported 12 years ago to the past while learning the Rangula magic spell. She's like Akari, not confident about her magic, and encourages Akari to mend and restore the bells of the Magic Academy which have broken down. She graduated from the academy after she won before Akari and Ruby met 12 years later.

Voiced by: Yui Horie
Celine Bright is Miria's mother. She is a good singer and famous worldwide celebrity, dubbing her as the famous Queen of Pop. She sincerely thinks her daughter to be important though she is busy. Miria and Akari meet Miria's mother's younger self in episode 14 along with Miria's younger self. Miria's older self told to her not to give up on her dreams and her daughter, even though it's hard due to her career.

Voiced by: Hidenobu Kiuchi
Akira Sakura is Akari and Monica's father. He is a shipbuilding architect working in the design of one of the ships in his company. Though he can be a bit lazy and sometimes gets tired a lot, he is a good father to both Akari and Monica. His favourite hobby is fishing and he has a collection of fishing rods that he received through mail orders, a thing that his wife is not happy about.

Voiced by: Takahashi Midori
Marie Sakura is Akari and Monica's mother. She's a chief editor at a magazine in which her sister is featured as well as a good mother. She is somehow unaware on Ruby's identity as a Jewelpet as Akari is taking care of her in their house. Though caring, she can be strict to her husband, especially when it comes to mail orders.

Voiced by: Hiroshi Shimozaki
A candidate of the Jewel Star Grand Prix and Yuku's human partner. He hails from the same school as Marianne does and is believed to have strong magical abilities. But he lacks precision and accuracy, which proven to be a disadvantage and costs him his match against Akari.

Voiced by: Rei Matsuzaki
Jewel Land's greatest prodigy and also Topaz's human partner who entered the Grand Prix. Little is known about her except for the Magical Angels telling she is a genius magician with good chances to win in the grand prix. But those were shattered as she and her Jewelpet partner are defeated by Laiya, another candidate. She then appeared to Akari and her friends warning them about the mysterious candidate she faced.

Voiced by: Asami Shimoda
Charlotte's human partner and candidate of the Grand Prix. She has the same smarts as Sara, however she is lax on answering questions.

Voiced by: Ao Takahashi
One of Akari's classmates in Winston Academy, Mai is an aspiring novelist who is very good on making stories for manga and organizer in Akari's class. She displays strong leadership in her class and is never afraid on making decisions or stopping fights. She was also the leader of the school's Manga Club and a huge fan of Monica.

Voiced by: Keiko Utsumi
Also one of Akari's classmates, and an executive in the school's Manga Club. She loves writing love stories with Nanami and dreams that her story will be featured on TV.

Voiced by: Yumi Sudō
Also one of Akari's classmates, and a member of the school's Manga Club. She loves writing love stories with Tomoe and has a dream on becoming a Kindergarten Teacher.

Voiced by: Manami Numakura
Also one of Akari's classmates, and a member of the school's Manga Club. She is a character designer for the school Manga.

Voiced by: Ai Shimizu
The homeroom teacher of Akari's class.

Jewel Landians

Voiced by: Ao Takahashi (Jewelpet Twinkle), Yūko Minaguchi (Jewelpet Sunshine), Ai Shimizu (Jewelpet Kira Deco), Aki Toyosaki (Jewelpet Happiness)
Jewelina is the Queen and ruler of Jewel Land. She is the most powerful of all the magicians of Jewel Land and created the Jewelpets a long time ago from the positive traits of all human beings on Earth. She also created the Jewel Star crown and the Jewel Star Grand Prix. Judy mentions about her during a conversation with Akari. Jewelina appeared in front of everyone during the festival in Jewel Land. She has a connection with Alma and Yuma's mother, Fealina.

In Sunshine, she retains her role as ruler of Jewel Land but had a major design change from a princess to a queen with wing-like hair. Despite being the queen of Jewel Land, she can be a bit dramatic sometimes in some situations. Later in the series, due to utter despair, she fuses herself with the Dark Jewel Magic to become Dark Jewelina, also known as Dark Jewelina (or ). She almost wiped out everyone in Jewel Land and take down Ruby's friends by spreading Dark Jewel Magic all over the world. But she was defeated by the combined efforts of both Kanon, Mikage, Ruby and the Jewelpets, freeing Jewelina from the Dark Jewel Magic and sending it back to once it came. As everything has been restored, she granted Mikage's wish to be a Jewelpet and used her magic to transform him in the epilogue.

In Kira Deco, Jewelina is the creator of all the Jewelpets who used the Mirror Ball to create them. She also likes to dance, doing the Go Go dancing with them. However, after the Mirror Ball is destroyed and the Deco Stones were scattered towards the planet, she turned to stone due to sadness. Her Jewel Pod is currently in Ruby's possession. In the end of the series, she and Professor Decortsky were the same person and revealed that her soul is separated from her body before she fully petrified.

In Happiness, Jewelina is the young ruler of Jewel Land and also the Headmaster of the Jewel Academy, who gave Ruby and her friends the Magical Jewel Box. She assigned Ruby to make friends and to open a Jewelpet Cafe right beside the cafeteria. She is also concern about the Red Moon incident and investigates on how to stop it.

Voiced by: Yu Shimamura
Fealina is the  mother of both Yuma and Alma, as well as one of the powerful magicians in Jewel Land. She made a wish to Jewelina to let her go to the Rarerare world and meet a man who has a strong power to live. Jewelina sent her to the human world and met Yuma and Alma's father in Alaska, and got married. However, because a powerful magician's life force wears away in the Rarerare world until said magician becomes dust, Fealina wanted to give up her magic to live in the Rarerare world and care for Alma and Yuma. Believing the Battest had a spell to take away one's magical power, she undid the seal on Battest—however, seeing the result, she sealed the Battest again, having to be in eternal sleep (but not dead) to do so. After her sacrifice, Jewelina separated the twins, Alma and Yuma, to make sure that the Battest won't be unlocked. Fealina's Jewelpet partners were both Opal and Angela.

By the Grand Prix Arc, Fealina is revived after the Battest has been sealed once again. And now she lives with both Yuma and Alma prior in the OVA.

Voiced by: Rei Sakuma
Ekanite is Sulfur's mother and a high-class magician in Jewel Land. You can clearly see the relationship between her and Sulfur—she looks almost exactly like him, save for her clothes and the fact that she's a female and Sulfur's a male. Ekanite was surprised about Sulfur being a teacher, as well as how immature Moldavite can be, sometimes calling him "Mole" and tormenting him using her spells. However, Ekanite understands her son's feelings very well even though Sulfur is rather clumsy and sometimes makes mistakes. Her name is based on Ekanite, a type of radioactive mineral.

Voiced by: Mitsuo Senda
The Fountain Dragon is a powerful dragon who lives in a mountains of Jewel Land, guarding the Dragon's Fountain at the top of the mountains. He is blue in color, has azure eyes, a mustache and wears a pair of glasses. When he talks, normally you can't see his mouth or mustache move. The Fountain Dragon is very intellectual and actually gentle but sometimes attacks intruders when disturbed. In the events of episode 13, he intentionally attacks Akari and Leon as part of their test to get another Jewel Stone.

 
Voiced by: Yuki Kaida
Albiana is a hermit and a powerful witch living in the western part of Jewel Land. First appearing in Episode 7, she is a grouchy old witch who hates trespassers and troublemakers. It is rumored that she can change someone into toads, bats, spiders and worms when someone trespasses her home in the Western Cave. She owns a powerful magic book which she lends to Akari so she can get the One Thousand and One Night Flowers and a pet chimera named Ryuku. Albiana also has a deep connection with the Fountain Dragon and knows the Battest and the consequences when it's unsealed—consequences that could lead to Jewel Land's destruction. She is also the mentor of Fealina who taught her magic and is still sad about her death after sealing the Battest, the reason she took on her ugly form. She gave Akari her staff to convince Alma to stop her from unsealing the forbidden item; however, Akari and Yuma fail to do so. Albiana can transform into her true form to increase her magical power. In her true form, she wears exactly the same clothes, however she have blonde hair and blue eyes.

Voiced by: Yuka Iguchi
Ametrine is one of the owners of Jewel Land's Magic Shop and Trystine's twin sister. She is a cat with yellow colored fur and wears purple Arabian-style clothing, a cream colored cape and a crown on top on her head. Her heterochromic eyes are arranged so her left eye is red while her right eye is purple. She and her sister gave the Jewel Pod and the Rare Rare Drops to Ruby. She and Trystine became recurring characters of the series. Ametrine also has good knowledge in magic as well, but not to an extent like the teachers of the Magic Academy. She also possess a Jewel Pod, which is used to browse on some spells they can use. Both the Twins also had a one-shot cameo in Kira Deco. Both their names is based on Ametrine, a type of Quartz.

Voiced by: Yuka Iguchi
Trystine is also one of the owners of Jewel Land's Magic Shop and Ametrine's twin sister. She is a cat with yellow colored fur and wears cream Arabian-style clothing, a purple colored cape and a tiara with flowers on top on her head. Her heterochromic eyes are arranged so her left eye is purple while her right eye is red. She and her sister gave the Jewel Pod and the Rare Rare Drops to Ruby. She and Ametrine became recurring characters of the series. Trystine also has good knowledge in magic as well, but not to an extent like the teachers of the Magic Academy. Both the Twins also had a one-shot cameo in Kira Deco. Both their names is based on Ametrine, a type of Quartz.

Voiced by: Tetsuya Yanagihara
I-Am-Pen is a magical fountain pen shaped like a penguin who comes in the Jewel Net Harada's Manga Set. He transforms from a usual pen to a pen-sized penguin to help artists, normally Akari, in a pinch. He also has the ability to talk and can cast magic by writing down a magic spell onto the paper, though he sometimes makes mistakes. He is currently living with Akari as a tutor for her to make decent manga.

Voiced by: Nozomi Sasaki
Avenue is the waiter of the Strawberry Cafe. She is a pink rabbit wearing a pink waiter's outfit with strawberries. She is rarely seen in the series, but when she is seen she is serving sweets for Akari and her friends. Avenue has two appearances in Kira Deco, but her major is in Episode 38, as Deco Santa.

 and 
Voiced by: N/A
Jolly and Merry are the mascot characters of Moldavite's mail order magazine, the Jewel Net Harada. They're both female anthropomorphic dogs and like Ametrine and Toristein, they're also twins. The only differences are that Jolly has cream colored fur and wears a blue Playboy bunny outfit while Merry has brown colored fur and wears a red Playboy bunny outfit. They both introduce recommended magic goods for the magic mail order. Moldavite likes Jolly, Merry, and the mail orders, which often makes Halite angry.

Antagonists
/
Voiced by: Megumi Takamoto (Alma), Kanako Sasaki (Laiya)
Diana and Opal's human partner and the series' main antagonist, She's the twin sister of Yuma and one of Fealina's twin children. Both Yuma and Alma's mother died a long time ago during their childhood and Jewelina adopted her as her foster child. She then entrusted Halite and Moldavite to take care of her while in the Magic Academy. During that time, she didn't want to interact with everyone else around her or make new friends. Sometimes called the "strongest wizard in the Jewel Land" by Diana, she is a mysterious person who looks like Yuma except for the long braided hair at the back and the black outfit she wears. In the earlier episodes, she is either hiding in the shadows watching over Akari or she is seeing if she is able to do magic well, and her face is partially covered to prevent her identity to be revealed. Alma's face is revealed in episode 7, watching over Akari through a crystal ball. She revealed himself to Akari and her friends alongside Diana. She has overwhelming abilities and magical powers that can even rival Jewelina herself (it is later revealed that when Alma and Yuma are together, Alma's powers actually exceed those of Jewelina despite Yuma being a completely normal and magic-less boy), but her magic has a terrible side effect as it drains away her life force and using it continuously would result in her death. It was revealed further that Alma was actually a girl after Opal used her Jewel Flash, letting Alma's black clothes change to a white dress. She and Yuma were once together but both of them were separated by Jewelina during childhood due to fear of awakening of the forbidden item, the Battest. Because she misunderstood the reason as to why she and Yuma were separated, Alma wants to use the item to take revenge on Jewelina, revive her mother, and let Yuma, Alma herself, and their mother live together again.

During the Grand Prix Arc, it is shown that both she and Diana survived and entered the Jewel Star Grand Prix under the Alias Laiya. In her new Identity, her black hair is now colored white after absorbing some of the Battest's powers and somehow defeated both Hilde and Topaz during the preliminaries of the competition. During the Semi-Finals, she defeated and injured both Leon and Dian, resulting to her win. The power of the Battest finally awakens inside her body during the finals as she plans on eliminating not just Jewelina, but also Akari as well. She finally redeemed herself after sealing the Battest and reviving Diana, Opal and Fealina. By the OVA, she is now living alongside Fealina and Yuma in a family-run flower shop.

References
 http://www.tv-tokyo.co.jp/anime/jewelpet2/

Jewelpet Twinkle